Joe S. Adams, Jr. is an American private investigator and former mercenary who trained the forces of, and acted as a bodyguard for, Adolfo Calero, one of the leaders of the Contra rebellion in Nicaragua.  In his 1988 trial in Florida for violations of the Neutrality Act, Adams was accused of having done so on behalf of the United States Central Intelligence Agency.  Adams was the first person indicted in Iran-Contra, was convicted, sentenced to one day of unsupervised probation and a $50.00 fine, and then pardoned.  Adams has been the subject of over 100 newspaper articles. Adams has also been featured in mercenary magazines such as Eagle and Soldier of Fortune.

A former member of the United States Marine Corps, Adams has also worked as a mercenary and security consultant in Southeast Asia, Africa, and Europe.  He currently operates Adams Investigations in St. Louis, Missouri and has worked numerous high-profile cases there, including the capture of an FBI Top Ten Most-Wanted Fugitive.

Adams is a former bodybuilder and powerlifter who appeared in several of Joe Weider's publications in the 1970s, and appeared in shoots with former California governor Arnold Schwarzenegger. 

In the 1980s, Adams was the subject of controversy in the St. Louis area when, acting as a bounty hunter, a prisoner in his custody died from the effects of a stun gun.

Multiple sources are questionable in Mr. Adams timeline except for two years of service as a cook for in the United States Marine Corp and the multitudes of news articles where his (featured articles) were published in the opinionated sections.

Adams currently operates under the guise of a commissioned officer for a self started militia group (Washington Guard) in a town outside of St. Louis, MO.

References
Bainerman, J. The Crimes of a President. 1992 (42-3)
Christic Institute. Sheehan Affidavit. 1988-03-25 (125, 128, 138–9)
Marshall, J. The Iran-Contra Connection. 1987 (271)
Newsweek 1986-11-03 (35)
Scott, P.D. and Marshall, J. Cocaine Politics. 1991 (152, 158)
Sklar, H. Washington's War on Nicaragua. 1988 (286-7)
Terrell, J. Disposable Patriot. 1992 (160-1, 410)
The Progressive, March 1987

American bodybuilders
Living people
Place of birth missing (living people)
Year of birth missing (living people)
United States Marines
American mercenaries
Male bodybuilders
American sportsmen